Crossett School District  is a school district headquartered in Crossett in Ashley County, Arkansas. In addition to Crossett it serves West Crossett and most of North Crossett.

The district operates Crossett Elementary School, Crossett Middle School, and Crossett High School.

References

External links
 
 

School districts in Arkansas
Education in Ashley County, Arkansas